Representation of Sheppard re Powell is a Jersey Court of Appeal case relating to eviction injunctions. The court ruled that a  could not be used to block court orders and fined Powell £50 for incorrect usage.

Background 
Caroline Powell was a homeowner in St Brelade. She was subject to insolvency proceedings that included repossession of her house. The application failed and Powell was deemed to have made  to any rights. An appeal to the Court of Appeal ruled that Powell had a "precarious interest" in the property and was granted  to sell the property to pay creditors but she refused to allow people to view the house. The jurats ruled that interest expired on 27 November 2020 after the Royal Court ruled the Sheppards to be  after purchasing the house and ordered the Viscount of Jersey to oversee eviction procedures.

Initial case 
According to law, an interim injunction was automatically in force and the officers were obliged to stop until the matter could be adjudicated.

The case was heard at the Royal Court after the property owner applied to the court to have the injunction lifted. The deputy Bailiff presided over the case. Powell responded stating that the Royal Court judgment affirming the eviction process was made without her present and using incorrect evidence.

Appeal 
Powell indicated she intended to appeal to the Court of Appeal on the grounds that her case was distinct enough to distinguish from the 2000 case and that there had been deception in the gaining of the original eviction ruling. The appeal was heard by Commissioners Sir William Bailhache, James McNeill and George Bompas. Commissioner Bailhache described the case as "hopeless from the outset" though he stated Powell could appeal to the Judicial Committee of the Privy Council but that she would face an "uphill battle". They also granted Sheppard's request for costs for what Sheppard's attorney argued was a "frivolous and vexatious" lawsuit.

References 

Jersey case law
2021 in Jersey